The somatic nervous system (SNS), or voluntary nervous system is the part of the peripheral nervous system associated with the voluntary control of body movements via skeletal muscles.

The somatic nervous system consists of sensory nerves carrying afferent nerve fibers, which relay sensation from the body to the central nervous system (CNS), and motor nerves carrying efferent nerve fibers, which relay motor commands from the CNS to stimulate muscle contraction.

The a- of afferent and the e- of efferent correspond to the prefixes ad- (to, toward) and ex- (out of).

Structure
There are 43 segments of nerves in the human body. With each segment, there is a pair of sensory and motor nerves. In the body, 31 segments of nerves are in the spinal cord and 12 are in the brain stem. Besides these, thousands of association nerves are also present in the body.

Thus the somatic nervous system consists of two parts:
 Spinal nerves: They are mixed nerves that carry sensory information into and motor commands out of the spinal cord.
 Cranial nerves: They are the nerve fibers that carry information into and out of the brain stem. They include smell, eye muscles, mouth, taste, ear, neck, shoulders, and tongue.

Function

The somatic nervous system controls all voluntary muscular systems within the body, and the process of voluntary  reflex arcs.

The basic route of nerve signals within the efferent somatic nervous system involves a sequence that begins in the upper cell bodies of motor neurons (upper motor neurons) within the precentral gyrus (which approximates the primary motor cortex). Stimuli from the precentral gyrus are transmitted from upper motor neurons, down the corticospinal tract, to lower motor neurons (alpha motor neurons) in the brainstem and ventral horn of the spinal cord: upper motor neurons release a neurotransmitter called glutamate from their axon terminal knobs, which is received by glutamate receptors on the lower motor neurons: from there, acetylcholine is released from the axon terminal knobs of alpha motor neurons and received by postsynaptic receptors (nicotinic acetylcholine receptors) of muscles, thereby relaying the stimulus to contract muscle fibers.

Reflex arcs
A reflex arc is a neural circuit that creates a more or less automatic link between a sensory input and a specific motor output.  Reflex circuits vary in complexity—the simplest spinal reflexes are mediated by a two-element chain, of which in the human body there is only one, also called a monosynaptic reflex (there is only one synapse between the two neurones taking part in the arc: sensory and motor). The singular example of a monosynaptic reflex is the patellar reflex. The next simplest reflex arc is a three-element chain, beginning with sensory neurons, which activate interneurons inside of the spinal cord, which then activate motor neurons.  Some reflex responses, such as withdrawing the hand after touching a hot surface, are protective, but others, such as the patellar reflex ("knee jerk") activated by tapping the patellar tendon, contribute to ordinary behavior.

Other animals
In invertebrates, depending on the neurotransmitter released and the type of receptor it binds, the response in the muscle fiber could either be excitatory or inhibitory.  For vertebrates, however, the response of a skeletal striated muscle fiber to a neurotransmitter – always acetylcholine (ACh) – can only be excitatory.

See also
Autonomic nervous system
Enteric nervous system
Nervous system

References

 
Sensory systems
Peripheral nervous system